Bath Tangle is a Regency romance novel by Georgette Heyer. The story is set in 1816.

Plot summary

After the death of the Earl of Spenborough all are shocked when they discover that the late Earl has appointed Ivo Barrasford, Marquess of Rotherham, and formerly engaged to Lady Serena Carlow, to be Serena's trustee. 
Serena moves to Bath with her young stepmother, Fanny, where she meets up with Major Hector Kirkby, a love interest from six years past. Serena and Hector rekindle their romance and become engaged, although keeping the engagement under wraps while she is still in mourning for her father.

Meanwhile, Rotherham, having heard of the engagement, proposes to Emily Laleham, a very simple young lady whose social climbing mother is delighted with Rotherham's fortune and title. Whilst Emily recuperates in Bath, Serena's fiance Hector and her stepmother, Fanny, have fallen in love; they are much more better-suited to each other than he is to Serena. Serena and Rotherham still have feelings for one another, as well.

Rotherham, who has begun to believe that his fiance Emily would wish to end their engagement, is confronted by his young ward Gerard Monksleigh, who is in love with Emily. At first furious and contemptuous of his ward, Rotherham soon realises that they had all made a mistake and tries to make his betrothed cry off. When he has finally succeeded, however, Serena steps in and ruins all his plans. A row between guardian and ward ensues with Rotherham storming off to make sure that his engagement over.

Rotherham eventually reveals to Serena that he loves her and she admits that she loves him too. They embrace, and are interrupted by Hector, her betrothed. He is all too happy to see this, since it frees them all to be with the person they each love and are best suited with.

Characters
Lady Serena Carlow - the heroine, 25, daughter of the 5th earl of Spenborough 		

Ivo Spencer Barrasford, Marquess of Rotherham - former fiancé of Lady Serena, appointed her trustee upon the death of her father until her marriage by his consent, Late 30s, wears breeches, top boots and Belcher neckties
 
Fanny Carlow, Lady Spenborough, Dowager Countess of Spenborough, widow of the 5th earl, Serena's stepmother and friend, 23		

Hartley Carlow, 6th Earl of Spenborough, cousin of the 5th earl, his country seat is Milverly	
	
Major Hector Kirkby - a suitor of Serena's rejected by the earl when he was a Captain  	
		
Emily Laleham - a debutante		
	
Lady Laleham - a social climber trying to dissociate herself from her mercantile past	
		
Mrs Floore - Lady Laleham's mother, widow of Mr Sebden, a gentleman, and Mr Ned Floore, a soap maker	
	
Mr Goring - a merchant's son educated at Rugby and Cambridge
		
Gerard Monksleigh - one of Lord Rotherham's wards, a child of a cousin
		
Lady Theresa Eaglesham - Serena's aunt

References

1955 British novels
Novels by Georgette Heyer
Historical novels
Fiction set in 1816
Novels set in the 1810s
Heinemann (publisher) books
Regency romance novels